Below are the results for season 16 (XVI) of the World Poker Tour (2017–18).

Results

WPT Beijing

 Casino: NUO Hotel, Beijing, China
 Buy-in: Invitational
 5-Day Event: April 15-19, 2017
 Number of Entries: 400
 Total Prize Pool: CNY 9,600,000
 Number of Payouts: 50

WPT Amsterdam

 Casino: Holland Casino, Amsterdam, Netherlands
 Buy-in: €3,300
 5-Day Event: May 9-13, 2017
 Number of Entries: 224
 Total Prize Pool: €672,000
 Number of Payouts: 28

WPT Choctaw

 Casino: Choctaw Casino Resort, Durant, Oklahoma
 Buy-in: $3,700
 5-Day Event: August 4-8, 2017
 Number of Entries: 924
 Total Prize Pool: $3,121,980
 Number of Payouts: 99

Legends of Poker

 Casino: The Bicycle Hotel & Casino, Bell Gardens, California
 Buy-in: $4,000
 7-Day Event: August 25-31, 2017
 Number of Entries: 763
 Total Prize Pool: $2,738,407
 Number of Payouts: 81

Borgata Poker Open

 Casino: Borgata Hotel Casino & Spa, Atlantic City, New Jersey
 Buy-in: $3,500
 6-Day Event: September 17-22, 2017
 Number of Entries: 1,132
 Total Prize Pool: $3,623,532
 Number of Payouts: 110

WPT Maryland

 Casino: Maryland Live! Casino, Hanover, Maryland
 Buy-in: $3,500
 5-Day Event: September 30-October 4, 2017
 Number of Entries: 561
 Total Prize Pool: $2,000,000
 Number of Payouts: 71

bestbet Bounty Scramble

 Casino: bestbet Jacksonville, Jacksonville, Florida
 Buy-in: $5,000
 5-Day Event: October 21-25, 2017
 Number of Entries: 323
 Total Prize Pool: $1,501,950
 Number of Payouts: 41

WPT Montreal

 Casino: Playground Poker Club, Kahnawake, Quebec
 Buy-in: $3,850
 7-Day Event: November 10-16, 2017
 Number of Entries: 606
 Total Prize Pool: $2,057,370
 Number of Payouts: 76

Five Diamond World Poker Classic

 Casino: Bellagio Resort & Casino, Las Vegas, Nevada
 Buy-in: $10,400
 6-Day Event: December 5-10, 2017
 Number of Entries: 812
 Total Prize Pool: $7,876,400
 Number of Payouts: 81

WPT Berlin

 Casino: Casino Spielbank, Berlin, Germany
 Buy-in: €3,300
 4-Day Event: January 12-15, 2018
 Number of Entries: 339
 Total Prize Pool: €1,000,000
 Number of Payouts: 43

Lucky Hearts Poker Open

 Casino: Seminole Hard Rock Hotel and Casino, Hollywood, Florida
 Buy-in: $3,500
 6-Day Event: January 19-24, 2018
 Number of Entries: 911
 Total Prize Pool: $2,915,200
 Number of Payouts: 114

Borgata Winter Poker Open

 Casino: Borgata, Atlantic City, New Jersey
 Buy-in: $3,500
 6-Day Event: January 28-February 2, 2018
 Number of Entries: 1,244
 Total Prize Pool: $3,967,000
 Number of Payouts: 157

Fallsview Poker Classic

 Casino: Fallsview Casino, Niagara Falls, Ontario
 Buy-in: $5,000
 3-Day Event: February 10-12, 2018
 Number of Entries: 517
 Total Prize Pool: $2,337,803
 Number of Payouts: 67

L.A. Poker Classic

 Casino: Commerce Casino, Commerce, California
 Buy-in: $10,000
 6-Day Event: February 24-March 1, 2018
 Number of Entries: 493
 Total Prize Pool: $4,681,035
 Number of Payouts: 62

WPT Rolling Thunder

 Casino: Thunder Valley Casino Resort, Lincoln, California
 Buy-in: $3,500
 5-Day Event: March 2-6, 2018
 Number of Entries: 440
 Total Prize Pool: $1,408,000
 Number of Payouts: 55

Seminole Hard Rock Poker Showdown

 Casino: Seminole Hard Rock Hotel and Casino, Hollywood, Florida
 Buy-in: $3,500
 6-Day Event: April 13-18, 2018
 Number of Entries: 1,309
 Total Prize Pool: $4,188,800
 Number of Payouts: 164

WPT Amsterdam

 Casino: Holland Casino, Amsterdam, Netherlands
 Buy-in: €3,300
 5-Day Event: April 16-20, 2018
 Number of Entries: 207
 Total Prize Pool: €590,170
 Number of Payouts: 26

Bellagio Elite Poker Championship

 Casino: Bellagio, Las Vegas, Nevada
 Buy-in: $10,400
 6-Day Event: May 1-6, 2018
 Number of Entries: 126
 Total Prize Pool: $1,220,200
 Number of Payouts: 16

Bobby Baldwin Classic

 Casino: Aria Resort and Casino, Las Vegas, Nevada
 Buy-in: $10,000
 4-Day Event: May 20-23, 2018
 Number of Entries: 162
 Total Prize Pool: $1,555,200
 Number of Payouts: 21
 Note: Elias became the first player to win four WPT titles

WPT Tournament of Champions

 Casino: Aria Resort and Casino, Las Vegas, Nevada
 Buy-in: $15,000
 3-Day Event: May 24-26, 2018
 Number of Entries: 80
 Total Prize Pool: $1,365,000
 Number of Payouts: 10

Player of the Year

External links
Official site

World Poker Tour
2017 in poker
2018 in poker